Bill Evans at Town Hall is a live album by American jazz pianist Bill Evans and his Trio, released in 1966.

Reception

Writing for Allmusic, music critic Scott Yanow called the album: "... a superior effort by Bill Evans and his trio in early 1966... this live set features the group mostly performing lyrical and thoughtful standards... However the most memorable piece is the 13½-minute "Solo - In Memory of His Father," an extensive unaccompanied exploration by Evans that partly uses a theme that became "Turn Out the Stars.""

Track listing

Side one
 "I Should Care" (Sammy Cahn, Axel Stordahl, Paul Weston) – 5:30
 "Spring Is Here" (Richard Rodgers, Lorenz Hart) – 5:00
 "Who Can I Turn To" (Leslie Bricusse, Anthony Newley) – 6:17

Side two
 "Make Someone Happy" (Betty Comden, Adolph Green, Jule Styne) – 4:45
 "Solo - In Memory of His Father Harry L. (Prologue/Improvisation on Two Themes/Story Line/Turn Out the Stars/Epilogue)" (Evans) – 13:40

Reissue
 "I Should Care" (Sammy Cahn, Axel Stordahl, Paul Weston) – 5:30
 "Spring Is Here" (Richard Rodgers, Lorenz Hart) – 5:00
 "Who Can I Turn To" (Leslie Bricusse, Anthony Newley) – 6:17
 "Make Someone Happy" (Betty Comden, Adolph Green, Jule Styne) – 4:45
 "In Memory of His Father Harry L. (Prologue/Story Line/Turn Out the Stars/Epilogue)" (Evans) – 13:40
 "Beautiful Love" (Haven Gillespie, Wayne King, Egbert Van Alstyne, Victor Young) – 6:56
 "My Foolish Heart" (Ned Washington, Victor Young) – 4:51
 "One for Helen" (Evans) – 5:51

Personnel
Bill Evans – piano, keyboards
Chuck Israels – bass
Arnold Wise – drums

Chart positions

References

External links
The Bill Evans Memorial Library

Bill Evans live albums
1966 live albums
Verve Records live albums
Albums recorded at the Town Hall